Agnieszka Jędrzejewicz (born 6 June 1998) is a Polish footballer who plays as a midfielder and has appeared for the Poland women's national team.

Career
Jędrzejewicz has been capped for the Poland national team, appearing for the team during the 2019 FIFA Women's World Cup qualifying cycle.

References

External links
 
 
 

1998 births
Living people
Polish women's footballers
Poland women's international footballers
Women's association football midfielders
KKS Czarni Sosnowiec players